Duško Ðorđević was a Croatian rower. He competed in two events at the 1948 Summer Olympics.

References

Year of birth missing
Year of death missing
Croatian male rowers
Olympic rowers of Yugoslavia
Rowers at the 1948 Summer Olympics
Place of birth missing